Mohammadabad-e Do (also Romanized as Moḩammadābād-e Do; also known as Moḩammadābād, Moḩammadābād-e Sārdū’īyeh, and Mohammad Abad Sardoo’iyeh) is a village in Esfandaqeh Rural District, in the Central District of Jiroft County, Kerman Province, Iran. At the 2006 census, its population was 73, in 19 families.

References 

Populated places in Jiroft County